Markus Kennedy (born August 3, 1991) is an American basketball player who last played for San Severo of the Serie A2 Basket. He competed in college for Villanova and SMU.

College career
Kennedy averaged 3.0 points and 4.4 rebounds per game as a freshman at Villanova. After the season he opted to transfer to SMU to play under Larry Brown. As a sophomore, Kennedy averaged 12.4 points, 7.1 rebounds, and 1.5 steals per game. He was suspended for the first semester of his junior season due to poor academic performance. Kennedy averaged 11.9 points and 6.3 rebounds per game as a junior, shooting 54.8 percent from the field. He was named American Athletic Conference Sixth Man of the Year as well as AAC tournament MVP. Kennedy was selected to the Second Team All-AAC. He posted 9.3 points, 6.3 rebounds and 2.2 assists per game as senior.

Professional career
On September 19, 2016, Kennedy signed with Yeşilgiresun Belediye of the Turkish Basketball Super League but did not play for the team. Kennedy spent his first professional season with the Rio Grande Valley Vipers of the NBA Development League and averaged 18 points and 11 rebounds per game over 11 games. On July 22, 2017, he signed with Italian club Pistoia Basket 2000. After averaging 10.9 points and 8.8 rebounds per game, he left the team on December 28. Kennedy agreed to a deal with HTV Basket of the LNB Pro A on January 4, 2018. Kennedy averaged 9 points and 5.2 rebounds per game. On February 27, he signed with JDA Dijon Basket. Kennedy signed a deal with Socar Petkim S.K. of the Turkish Basketball First League on August 14. He joined San Severo in 2019, but his contract was terminated in January 2020.

The Basketball Tournament
Markus Kennedy played for Team Sons of Westwood in the 2018 edition of The Basketball Tournament. In one game, he had five points, one rebound and one assist. Team Sons of Westwood ALS made it to the Super 16 before falling to Team Challenge ALS.

References

External links
SMU Mustangs bio
RealGM profile

1991 births
Living people
American expatriate basketball people in France
American expatriate basketball people in Italy
American men's basketball players
Basketball players from Pennsylvania
People from Yeadon, Pennsylvania
Petkim Spor players
Power forwards (basketball)
Rio Grande Valley Vipers players
SMU Mustangs men's basketball players
Sportspeople from Delaware County, Pennsylvania
Villanova Wildcats men's basketball players